Frederick Simpson (March 1878 – May 19, 1945) was a Mississauga Ojibway Canadian athlete who competed in the Olympic games in 1908. He was born at the Alderville Indian Reserve, Ontario. He received an invitation to be on the Canadian Olympic Team due to his performances at Peterborough Examiner road race and Hamilton Herald road race, where he finished third and second respectively. Simpson competed in the 1908 Summer Olympics in the men's marathon, but did not win a medal, placing 6th.

Simpson turned professional in 1909 racing in both Canada and the United States. In 1988 Simpson was inducted into the Peterborough & District Sports Hall of Fame.

References

1878 births
1945 deaths
Olympic track and field athletes of Canada
Athletes (track and field) at the 1908 Summer Olympics
Canadian male marathon runners
First Nations sportspeople
Track and field athletes from Ontario